Abidine Abidine (born 31 March 1993) is a Mauritanian long-distance runner. He competed in the 5000 metres event at the 2020 Summer Olympics.

Career
In August 2019 at the 2019 African Games, Abidine represented Mauritania in the 5000 metres and finished in 27th place with a time of 15:52.09.

Abidine was the flag bearer for Mauritania during the 2020 Summer Olympics Parade of Nations.

References

External links 
 

1993 births
Living people
Mauritanian male long-distance runners
Olympic athletes of Mauritania
Athletes (track and field) at the 2020 Summer Olympics
African Games competitors for Mauritania
Athletes (track and field) at the 2019 African Games